Hillpark Secondary School ( [aːɾʲt̪skɔl xnɔkʲ na pʰaːɾʲç]) is a non-denominational secondary school located at 36 Cairngorm Road in the south side of Glasgow, Scotland.

The school is one of 38 secondary schools in the Glasgow City Council area, and is named after the area in which the school is situated.

History 
Hillpark was created from the merger of two schools, Sir John Maxwell Secondary School and Strathbungo Secondary School. The building opened in 1967.

From 1987 to 2006, Hillpark had a Gaelic unit providing Gaelic medium education to pupils. This existed until the opening of the Glasgow Gaelic School.

In 2009, Hillpark was named as the most violent school in Scotland due to 120 exclusions in the previous year for physical assault against staff and amongst pupils, in addition to the carrying of weapons.

According to the SFC, only 10% of university applications from Hillpark pupils are accepted.

Facilities 
The school has a swimming pool, fitness suite, football pitch, games hall, library and a drama studio. There are also eight computer labs.

A significant feature of the school is the Autism Unit, also known as the Language and Communication Resource (LCR). Pupils identified as having an autism spectrum disorder are predominantly taught within mainstream classes with the support of LCR staff.

References

External links
Official website
Parentzone
Twitter
Facebook

Secondary schools in Glasgow
Educational institutions established in 1967